Egyptian water lily or Egyptian lotus may refer to:
 Blue Egyptian water lily (Nymphaea caerulea)
 White Egyptian water lily (Nymphaea lotus)